Security segregation, in the context of the securities industry, refers to regulatory rules requiring that customer assets held by a financial institution (generally a brokerage firm) be held separate from assets of the brokerage firm itself in a segregated account.

Thus, for example, in the United States the law (in particular, the SEC's customer protection rule, Rule 15c3-3) generally requires that a broker must take steps to hold separately, in separate (segregated) accounts on the broker's books, securities it holds for its customers from securities of the broker itself. The purpose of the rule is: a) to limit the broker's use of customer securities to support the broker's own business activities; and b) to facilitate the prompt return of customer securities in the event of the broker's insolvency. In many jurisdictions segregated accounts cannot be used to pay creditors during a liquidation and must be returned to the customers directly.

This securities segregation requirement was developed due to problems in the U.S. stock markets towards the end of the 1960s. At the time, there was not any requirement that brokers segregate client securities from the firm's own assets on the firm's books and records. When brokers went bankrupt, therefore, they were unable to return securities to their clients, inasmuch as they had not maintained accurate books and records of their clients' holdings.

See also
 Ponzi scheme
 Deposit insurance
 Trust account
 Securities account

References

Securities (finance)